Lincoln Center, more commonly known as Lincoln, is a city in and the county seat of Lincoln County, Kansas, United States.  As of the 2020 census, the population of the city was 1,171.

History

Settler George Green founded the town of Lincoln in 1870, naming it after the county.  "Center" was added to its name to indicate its location in the central part of the county. County residents initially voted to place the county seat in Lincoln Center. Elections in November 1870 resulted in the seat relocating to nearby Abram, sparking a county seat war. Another vote in February 1872 reversed the switch, and Lincoln Center again became the county seat. Residents relocated all the buildings in Abram to Lincoln, merging the two communities. The town was incorporated as the city of Lincoln Center in 1879, and is officially referred to as such in the United States Census.  Both the city government and local chamber of commerce refer to the city as Lincoln, and it appears as such on state maps and signs.

Lincoln grew rapidly over the following decade, more than doubling in size, and the city gradually modernized. Kansas Christian College opened in Lincoln in 1885. The Union Pacific Railroad opened a branch line through the city in 1886, bringing mail service. In 1900, after the previous courthouse burned down, a new one was built out of native limestone known locally as post rock. Rural mail delivery began in 1904, and telephony service began in 1905. In 1906, the city's first power plant opened, providing electric power. Beginning in the 1920s, the mechanization of agriculture reduced the need for farm work and gradually commercial farming operations consolidated family farms resulting in a reduction in the population. By 1950, the state highway commission had completed K-14 and K-18 through Lincoln.

In 1989, given the widespread, long-standing use of post rock limestone in local building construction, the Kansas Legislature named Lincoln County as "The Post Rock Capital of Kansas".

Geography
The city lies on the north side of the Saline River in the Smoky Hills region of the Great Plains. Yauger Creek, a tributary of the Saline River, flows south along the eastern edge of the city to its confluence with the Saline immediately south of the city. The confluence of the Saline and Lost Creek, another of the river's tributaries, is located immediately southwest of the city.

Climate
Lying in the southern periphery of North America's humid continental climate (Köppen Dfa), Lincoln experiences hot, humid summers and cold, dry winters. The average temperature is 55.1 °F (12 °C), and the average yearly precipitation is 27.4 inches (69 cm). Snowfall averages 19.3 inches (49 cm) per year. On average, July is the warmest month, January is the coldest month, and May is the wettest month. The hottest temperature recorded in Lincoln was 117 °F (47 °C) in 1947; the coldest temperature recorded was -27 °F (-33 °C) in 1989.

Demographics

2010 census
As of the 2010 United States Census, there were 1,297 people, 576 households, and 324 families residing in the city. The racial makeup of the city was 96.6% White, 1.1% American Indian, 0.3% African American, 0.1% Asian, 0.8% from some other race, and 1.2% from two or more races. Hispanics and Latinos of any race were 2.8% of the population.

There were 576 households, of which 24.1% had children under the age of 18 living with them, 43.2% were married couples living together, 9.5% had a female householder with no husband present, 3.5% had a male householder with no wife present, and 43.8% were non-families. 40.6% of all households were made up of individuals, and 20.1% had someone living alone who was 65 years of age or older. The average household size was 2.16, and the average family size was 2.95.

The median age in the city was 44.9 years. 25.1% of residents were under the age of 18; 5.6% were between the ages of 18 and 24; 19.4% were from 25 to 44; 25.1% were from 45 to 64; and 24.7% were 65 years of age or older. The gender makeup of the city was 46.6% male and 53.4% female.

The median income for a household in the city was $37,308, and the median income for a family was $47,679. Males had a median income of $33,650 versus $28,438 for females. The per capita income for the city was $19,949. About 13.0% of families and 15.1% of the population were below the poverty line, including 19.6% of those under age 18 and 5.7% of those age 65 or over.

Government
Lincoln is a city of the second class with a mayor-council form of government. The city council consists of five members, and it meets on the second Monday of each month.

As the county seat, Lincoln is the administrative center of Lincoln County. The county courthouse is located downtown, and all departments of the county government base their operations in the city.

Lincoln lies within Kansas's 1st U.S. Congressional District. For the purposes of representation in the Kansas Legislature, the city is located in the 35th district of the Kansas Senate and the 107th district of the Kansas House of Representatives.

Education

Primary and secondary education
The community is served by Lincoln USD 298 public school district, which operates two public schools in Lincoln: Lincoln Elementary School (Grades Pre-K-6) and Lincoln Junior/Senior High School (7-12).

Infrastructure

Transportation
Lincoln sits immediately south of the intersection of Kansas state highways K-14, which runs north-south through the city, and K-18, which wraps around the northern and eastern edges of the city.

Lincoln Municipal Airport, a general aviation facility, is located roughly a mile northwest of the city on K-18.

A line of the Kansas & Oklahoma Railroad runs through the west side of the city.

Media
Lincoln has one weekly newspaper, The Lincoln Sentinel-Republican.

Notable people
Notable individuals who were born in and/or have lived in Lincoln include:
 William Baker (1831-1910), U.S. Representative from Kansas
 Jessa Crispin (1978- ), book critic
 Don Wendell Holter (1905-1999), Methodist bishop
 Daniel Ray Hull (1890-1964), landscape architect
 Martin Johnson (1884-1937), adventurer, explorer, and documentary filmmaker
 Jack Knight (1893-1945), Aviation pioneer
 Bessie Anderson Stanley (1879-1952), poet
 Uncas A. Whitaker (1900-1975), engineer, entrepreneur

See also
 List of oil pipelines

References

Further reading

External links

 City of Lincoln
 Lincoln - Directory of Public Officials
 , from Hatteberg's People on KAKE TV news
 Historic Images - Wichita State University Libraries
 Lincoln city map, KDOT

Cities in Kansas
County seats in Kansas
Cities in Lincoln County, Kansas
1870 establishments in Kansas
Populated places established in 1870